Young Black Teenagers is the debut album by rap group, Young Black Teenagers.  The album was released in 1991 and produced by Hank Shocklee. It appeared on his S.O.U.L Records label.  Although the album did not do as well as the group's follow-up album, the album featured one hit single, "Loud & Hard To Hit", which made it to #25 on the Hot Rap Singles.  The album cover is a parody of The Beatles' With The Beatles. Q Magazine described it as "YBT have a enough power, but their songs edge towards monotony".

Track listing
"Punks, Lies & Video Tape"-  4:11 
"Korner Groove"- 3:57 
"Traci"- 2:37 
"First Stage of a Rampage Called the Rap Rage"- 3:51 
"Nobody Knows Kelli"- 3:27 
"Daddy Kalled Me Niga Cause I Likeded to Rhyme"- 2:59 
"Chillin' Wit Me Posse"- 2:05 
"Mack Daddy Don of the Underworld"- 3:48 
"Loud and Hard to Hit"- 3:35 
"My TV Went Black and White on Me"- 3:32 
"Proud to Be Black"- 4:42 
"To My Donna"- 3:22 
"My Color TV"- 3:34

Samples
"Proud to Be Black"
"The Boss" by James Brown

Personnel

 Adam "Firstborn" Weiner – rapping, main artist, songwriter
 Ron "Kamron" Winge – rapping, main artist, songwriter
 ATA – rapping, main artist, songwriter
 Tommy Never – rapping, main artist, songwriter
 Scott "DJ Skribble" Ialacci – main artist, turntables, sampler

References

Young Black Teenagers albums
1991 albums
MCA Records albums